Saskatchewan Interactive (also known as Saskatchewan Interactive Media Association Inc., SaskInteractive and SIMA) is an organization based in Saskatchewan, Canada, that aims to represent interactive media development in the province. This includes media such as mobile devices, video games, and software. They speak on behalf of their members to the government, general public, media and industry. " Saskatchewan Interactive Media Association Inc. (SaskInteractive) is the professional voice of the interactive media industry in Saskatchewan."

History and background 

According to the news archive available on the association's website, the association was first accessible via the internet in 2001. It is not indicated when the association was actually founded but it became increasingly popular after the development of the first web page.  Prior to 2006 Saskatchewan Interactive was known as Saskatchewan New Media Developers Association. With the growing advancements of mobile technologies, the association has been becoming more popular and powerful.

Saskatchewan Interactive is known for being very supportive and interactive with their members and contributors. Every year (besides 2011) they have an award ceremony to celebrate the successes of the people and companies involved. As of 2010, there are fourteen categories that the members can apply for awards in. Generally, people attend the ceremonies and are given an award certificate or plaque. Bitspin Technologies was a winner of a 2009 award.

Objectives 

The association aims to provide companies and people with less of an economic footprint in the media sector, a voice to be heard by the government and industry. They outline several key objectives on their main webpage:

 To foster the growth of the industry to create economic opportunities and jobs.
 To provide a network to enhance communication within the industry and act as an advocate for the industry.
 To provide professional development opportunities to respond to the creative, technical and administrative needs of the industry.
 To raise public awareness of the SaskInteractive and the benefits of using new media.
 To increase the profile of the industry and enable marketing and exporting opportunities.
 To liaise between educational institutions and the industry to enhance training opportunities.
 To work with government in developing policies that will encourage the growth of the industry.
 To showcase developers and their achievements to each other and the world at large.

In addition, they travel with companies to business conferences to speak for, and on behalf of said businesses. They also provide guidance and instruction to public learning institutions in terms of media studies.

Membership 

Saskatchewan Interactive offers a membership program that allows people to get more involved in the media sector.  The association currently has approximately forty major contributing members, and a board of directors of eight people. Many of the members and directors are affiliated with other large technology companies, such as Sasktel and SIAST.

Membership costs are FREE for all applicants. Applying for membership in the association allows access to job posting, general news, and in some cases, voting privileges within the association. Another advantage to applying for membership is being part of a large networking system. Saskatchewan Interactive aims to gather new information about trends in the media sector and distribute such knowledge to its members.

Summits 

There have been three major summits at Saskatchewan Interactive, one in 2008, 2009 and 2010.

Summit 2008 

Summit 2008 was held in Saskatoon, Saskatchewan on 28 and 29 February 2008. The attempt of the summit was to bring awareness to new and current (2008) trends in the communication industry. The main websites indicates the nine types of trends that were described:

 Business
 Communications
 Education
 Enabling technologies
 Entertainment game development
 Government
 Health
 Industry
 Marketing

This was accomplished by one and half days of international speakers and several question and answer sessions. There were approximately, twenty major speakers from various sectors and area of business.   Different topics to discuss with the association including topics concerning children in the media age, virtual environment merging and designing learning environments.  The summit was supported by many companies, including Sasktel, and over fifty companies attended the summit with the addition of various other members. Overall, the summit was very successful and Saskatchewan Interactive saw an increase of member and member activity.

Summit 2009 

Summit 2009 was of very similar content and style to summit 2008. It took place on 19 and 20 March 2009. The summit planned a similar two-day discussion with special guest speaker to discuss communication trends. The focus of the group discussions, however, was more geared towards how new technology is improving life. This summit also featured the award ceremonies at the same event, along with a student presentation that allowed students from local high schools and universities to present their media ideas to businesses and university members.

Summit 2010 

Summit 2010, dubbed "Interactive 2010" was aimed to be a more interactive experience for the audience in which the major focus was to provide people with innovative ideas the opportunity to share. It took place in September 2010 and was only a one-day event. The 2010 summit was hosted by both SaskInteractive and SMPIA (Saskatchewan Motion Picture Industry Association). The results and findings in the Saskatchewan Interactive Media Association Sector Study Final Report were also discussed in great detail at the summit.

Saskatchewan Interactive Media Association Sector Study Final Report 

The Saskatchewan Interactive Media Association Sector Study Final Report is a report created by SaskInteractive that discusses various people's opinions on certain topics in the media sector, along with a financial discussion on funding in the areas. The report also discusses the economic impact of the specific media sectors.

Trends 
The report notes several current trends that were observed by the association's research. Globalization is a trend that is described in great detail. With the great advancements in technology and the ease of transferring media, international competition is becoming more of a concern for the interactive media sector. Level of support is also an important trend indicated in the report. The amount of funding from the public and the government directly affects the size of the sector and what the sector is capable of doing. It is indicated in several parts of the report that the main reason the interactive media field is so small in Saskatchewan is because of the lack of support. Another trend that was found, is that with the increasing popularity of mobile devices and interactive media the sector popularity and interest is growing.

Economic impact 
The report makes several observations on the overall economic impact of the media sector in Saskatchewan. It is noted that there are approximately 210 interactive media entities in Saskatchewan, in other words the sector is made up of 210 businesses. From this, approximately 680 full-time employees are employed in this sector. It is also noted in great detail that the amount of money earned by these people is significantly lower than those in other fields. 
An observation made is that increases in government funding and technological developments will increase the size of the sector along with the total income.

References 

Organizations based in Saskatchewan